Ezhunnallathu is a 1991 Indian Malayalam-language drama film directed by Harikumar and written by S. Bhasurachandran from a story by Harikumar. It stars Jayaram, Mukesh and Siddique.

Plot
Josutty is in search of his brother from a pre-marital relationship of his father. Dasappan and Subramanyam join the search whereas Josutty has heart problems and wants someone to look after his mother and wealth. To his despair, he finds he was the son of his father born from pre-marital relationship. He finds himself in love and decides to go to abroad for the surgery.

Cast
 Jayaram as Josutty
 Mukesh as Dasappan
 Siddique as Subramaniam
 Sithara as Ramani
 Sreeja as Asha
 Jagathy Sreekumar as Soman Pilla
 Innocent	
 Kaviyoor Ponnamma	
 Suchitra Murali as Sunanda
 Rajan P Dev as Ranger Uncle
 Philomina as Ammachy
 K. P. A. C. Sunny as Adv. V.B. Menon
 Jagannathan as Subramaniam's father
 Shivaji as Karunan
 Krishnankutty Nair as Njani Vasu Pillai
 Indrans as watch shop owner

References

External links

1991 films
1990s Malayalam-language films